Hellinsia fuscomarginata is a moth of the family Pterophoridae. It is found in Nepal and India (the state of Sikkim and city of Darjeeling in particular).

Its wingspan is 21–24 mm, with bone-yellow forewings. Adults have been recorded between July and August.

References

Moths described in 1991
fuscomarginata
Moths of Asia